= Allan Holstensson =

Swedish politician

Allan Holstensson (1878–1961) was a Swedish politician. He was a member of the Centre Party.
